This is a list of films made by the Indian director Mani Ratnam featuring the composer A. R. Rahman.

History and significance 
Mani Ratnam after his long relationship with Ilaiyaraaja, parted ways and introduced newcomer A. R. Rahman in Roja. He happened to listen and was impressed with Rahman's works, Ratnam visited his studio and listened to a tune that Rahman had composed long back on the Kaveri River water dispute. Ratnam signed him immediately for the film, which was the first one in his terrorism trilogy. Rahman, in spite of his reluctance to seriously take up work in films, accepted the offer since Ratnam had the reputation of a director with a good taste for music. Rahman later said, "I wasn't sure myself why I accepted Roja. I was offered ₹25,000 for it, a sum that I could make in three days composing ad jingles. I think it was the prospect of working with Mani that enticed me."

Roja was released in 1992 to universal acclaim. It is considered a milestone in Tamil and Indian film music that heralded the start of a new era. It was subsequently listed in Time magazine's World's "10 Best Soundtracks" of all time. By April 2017, they had worked together in 15 films altogether (of which two are bilingual and hence refer to the same soundtrack twice with a change in the language), with every soundtrack having marked a phenomenal critical and commercial success in Indian cinema. Rahman won three of his six National Awards from his association with Ratnam. Bombay, the most significant work from their combination, is the largest selling Indian music album of all time, with unprecedented sales of 12 million records.

List of films

See also 
 Albums in Telugu

Footnotes 

A ^ Many of Mani Ratnam's movies are in the Tamil language and are released simultaneously or later in multiple languages, usually Telugu and Hindi.
B ^ Only the major awards won for Best Music Direction are listed here. Several featured artists from the films have won numerous other awards.
C ^ Alaipayuthey and O Kadhal Kanmani had Hindi remakes titled Saathiya and OK Jaanu respectively; those were scored by A.R. Rahman but direction credited to his assistant Shaad Ali. Story, screenplay and produced by Mani Ratnam himself.

References 

Indian filmographies
Films
Director filmographies